The boys' football tournament at the 2014 Summer Youth Olympics took place at the Jiangning Sports Center, located in Nanjing, China, between 15 and 27 August 2014.

Each match lasted 80 minutes, consisting of two periods of 40 minutes, with an interval of 15 minutes.

Participating teams
One team from each continental confederation participated in the tournament. The same country may not participate in both the boys' and girls' tournament. As hosts, China was given Asia's spot to compete in the girls' tournament (and thus could not participate in the boys' tournament). Invited teams were decided by FIFA during their meeting in Zürich on 3–4 October 2013. Teams may qualify through preliminary competitions, or be nominated for participation by their confederation, with the invited teams ratified by FIFA during their meeting in Zürich on 3–4 October 2013.

Squads

Players must be 15 years old (born between 1 January and 31 December 1999) to be eligible to participate. Each team consisted of 18 players (two of whom must be goalkeepers).

Match officials
A total of six referees and twelve assistant referees were appointed by FIFA for the tournament.

† Abdelkader Zitouni and Paul Ahupu are affiliated with the Football Association of Tahiti (French Polynesia). Since Tahiti is not a member of the IOC, they are listed by the IOC under France.

Group stage
The draw was held at the Hilton Hotel in Nanjing on 14 May 2014. The winners and runners-up of each group advance to the semi-finals. The rankings of teams in each group are determined as follows:
 points obtained in all group matches;
 goal difference in all group matches;
 number of goals scored in all group matches;
If two or more teams are equal on the basis of the above three criteria, their rankings are determined as follows:
 points obtained in the group matches between the teams concerned;
 goal difference in the group matches between the teams concerned;
 number of goals scored in the group matches between the teams concerned;
 drawing of lots by the FIFA Organising Committee.

All times are local: Nanjing in China Standard Time (UTC+8)

Group C

Group D

Knockout stage
In the knockout stages, if a match is level at the end of normal playing time, the match is determined by a penalty shoot-out (no extra time is played).

Semi-finals

Fifth place match

Bronze medal match

Gold medal match

Final ranking

Goalscorers
5 goals

 Helgi Gudjonsson
 Kim Gyuhyeong

3 goals

 Andradino Moniz Garcia
 Ricardo da Luz Fortes
 Mikel Santos
 Franklin Gil
 Jeong Woo-yeong
 Joo Hwimin
 Lee Jiyong

2 goals

 Alex Laureano
 Kolbeinn Finnsson
 Torfi Gunnarsson
 Fernando Pacheco

1 goal

 Kelvin Delgado Medina
 Kenny Nascimento Gomes
 Darwin Diego
 Aron Kari Adalsteinsson
 Quilian Meléndez
 Christopher Olivares
 Gerald Távara
 Kim Seongjun
 Jules Bororoa

2 own goals
 Fabio Ramos de Brito (playing against Iceland and Peru)

1 own goal

 Kristófer Kristinsson (playing against Peru)
 Benson Rarua (playing against South Korea)

References

External links
Event – Overview – Men , Nanjing 2014
Boys' Youth Olympic Football Tournament Nanjing 2014 , FIFA.com
FIFA Technical Report

Football at the 2014 Summer Youth Olympics